KAOS GL, short for Kaos Gay and Lesbian Cultural Research and Solidarity Association, founded in 1994, is one of the oldest and largest LGBT rights organisations in Turkey. In 2005, the Ankara-based organisation became the first Turkish LGBT organisation to be legally registered as an association, after their application was initially appealed by deputy governor of Ankara. The organisation has been publishing the journal KAOS GL (now a quarterly publication) since its founding. The group operates the KAOS Cultural Center, which hosts cultural activities, meetings, and showings of films. The centre also houses an LGBT history library.

The organization has also taken a stance on broader issues of human rights in Turkey. In 2017, a spokesperson for the organization stated: "AKP started a war against all opponents, not only Armenians. They stop opposition groups coming together and taking collective action. Social justice and peace is under our responsibility".

History

Founded in 1994, KAOS GL is one of the oldest LGBT rights organisations in Turkey. Students at Ankara University including Yasemin Öz met to discuss LGBTIQ issues and decided to start the group.

Struggle for legal registration
In July 2005, KAOS GL applied for Association status with the Ministry of the Interior. Subsequently, Ankara's deputy governor Selahattin Ekremoğlu petitioned a court to close the organisation, referring to articles 56 and 4721 of the Turkish Civil Code prohibiting establishment of an organisation that is against laws and morality. The threat of closure was criticized by the International Lesbian and Gay Association and Human Rights Watch, who considered it a violation of basic rights and yet another attempt at suppressing civil society in Turkey. On 12 October 2005, Ankara prosecutor Kursat Kayral however decided not to proceed with the case, concluding that homosexuality can't be equated with immorality. While in 2008 similar charges were brought against Istanbul-based LGBT organisation Lambda Istanbul, KAOS GL has been a legally registered non-government organisation (NGO) since October 2005.

March against Homophobia and Transphobia

On 17 May 2008, the fifth International Day Against Homophobia, Kaos GL and Pink Life LGBTT Association jointly organised the first annual LGBT march in Ankara. Joined by British MEP Michael Cashman and Dutch feminist writer Anja Meulenbelt, over 100 gay men and women, bisexuals and transgender people assembled in front of the Human Rights Monument in Yüksel Street, marching towards the parliament. Police, outnumbering the demonstrators, stopped the march, demanding the rainbow flags and banners be taken down. Otherwise, the march proceeded.

In May 2009, Kaos GL organised the second annual march against homophobia and transphobia in Ankara. The demonstration ended with a press statement, which called for the acknowledgement of lesbians, gays, bisexuals, transvestites and transsexuals (LGBTT).

Kaos GL has been organising international anti-homophobia meetings since May 2006. The Anti-Homophobia Meeting was first held as a four-day hall event in May 2006. In 2007, together with the central events, "Campus Meetings Against Homophobia" were realized in the three biggest university campuses of the capital, Ankara. The 4th annual meetings took place in six cities, from 1 May to 17 May 2009. The 4th International Anti-Homophobia Meeting started with the 1 May march in Ankara; and ended with the 17 May Anti-Homophobia March again in Ankara. Additional meeting took place also in the cities of Izmir, Eskisehir, Van, Diyarbakir and Istanbul together with Ankara.

See also

LGBT rights in Turkey
LEGATO
Category:LGBT museums and archives

References

External links
KAOS GL home page 
KAOS GL news page 
KAOS GL magazine 

LGBT political advocacy groups in Turkey
Peoples' Democratic Congress
1994 establishments in Turkey